Christies Beach High School is a comprehensive year 7 to 12 secondary school. It is located in the southern suburbs of Adelaide, South Australia.

References

External links
 Official school website

Secondary schools in Adelaide
High schools in South Australia
Public schools in South Australia